The 2002 World Championship of Ski Mountaineering was the first World Championship of Ski Mountaineering sanctioned by the International Council for Ski Mountaineering Competitions (ISMC), held at Serre Chevalier in the former French province Dauphiné from January 24 to January 27, 2002. In due to the heavy snowfall all events were postponed one day

The event was supported by the Fédération française de la montagne et de l’escalade (FFME). The 230 participants were from 22 nations and from three continents. Compared to the 1975  Trofeo Mezzalama, which was also held as "World Championship of Ski Mountaineering" with the classes "Civilians", "Soldiers" and "Mountain guides", the ICSM competition was only for members of the civilian national squads. Participants from countries without a squad could register with the help of the national mountain organizations.

Equipment 
The equipment of the participants was very different:

The weight of the ultra-light skis of the European top teams was only about  including binding. These teams also had the mentioned race suits as well as long and light Nordic skiing poles.

Results

Nation ranking and medals 
(all age groups)

Team 
event held on January 24, 2002
length: 19 kilometers
altitude differences: 
 ascent: 1,623m
 downhill: 1,623m

List of the 10 best teams by gender:

Individual 
event held on January 27, 2002
 male participants total (all age groups): 90
 female participants total (all age groups): 34
 altitude difference: 
 ascent: 1,505m
 downhill: 1,505m

List of the best 10 participants by gender:

Combination ranking 
(individual and team rankings)

List of the best 10 participants by gender:

References 

2002
World Championship Of Ski Mountaineering, 2002
International sports competitions hosted by France
World Championship Of Ski Mountaineering, 2002
Skiing competitions in France
World Championships of Ski Mountaineering